Eastwood is a constituency of the Scottish Parliament (Holyrood) covering part of the council area of East Renfrewshire. It elects one Member of the Scottish Parliament (MSP) by the first past the post method of election. It is also one of ten constituencies in the West Scotland electoral region, which elects seven additional members, in addition to the ten constituency MSPs, to produce a form of proportional representation for the region as a whole.

The seat has been held by Jackson Carlaw of the Scottish Conservatives since the 2016 Scottish Parliament election.

Electoral region 

The other nine constituencies of the West Scotland region are Clydebank and Milngavie, Cunninghame North, Cunninghame South, Dumbarton, Greenock and Inverclyde, Paisley, Renfrewshire North and West, Renfrewshire South and Strathkelvin and Bearsden.

The region covers part of the Argyll and Bute council area, the East Dunbartonshire council area, the East Renfrewshire council area, the Inverclyde council area, North Ayrshire council area, the Renfrewshire council area and the West Dunbartonshire council area.

Constituency boundaries and council area 

The Eastwood constituency was created at the same time as the Scottish Parliament, in 1999, with the name and boundaries of an  existing Westminster constituency. In 2005, however, the name of the Westminster (House of Commons) constituency was changed to East Renfrewshire.

In boundary changes in time for the 2011 Scottish Parliament election, the constituency of Eastwood was redrawn to be formed from the following electoral wards:

In full:
Giffnock and Thornliebank
Netherlee, Stamperland and Williamwood
Newton Mearns South and Eaglesham
Clarkston, Netherlee and Williamwood
In part:
Newton Mearns North and Neilston (shared with Renfrewshire South)

Constituency profile 
The Eastwood constituency is a highly affluent, middle-class commuter seat located south-west of Glasgow. It covers a majority of the East Renfrewshire council area, based principally around the towns of Newton Mearns, Eaglesham, Giffnock, Thornliebank, Netherlee, Busby and Clarkston which adjoin the City of Glasgow. According to data derived from the Scottish Index for Multiple Deprivation 60% of the seat's datazones are among the 10% most affluent areas in Scotland, with a further 15% of the seat's datazones being among the 20% most affluent areas in Scotland.

Data from the 2011 Scottish Census suggests that the seat has a substantial number of home-owners residing in large bungalows in comparison to the national average, with large portion of the seat's working population being employed in managerial, administrative and professional occupations.

Member of the Scottish Parliament 
The MSP for this constituency from its creation in 1999 was Ken Macintosh of Labour. In the 2016 election, Macintosh lost the seat, finishing third behind the Conservative victor Jackson Carlaw; however, he was returned as an MSP for the West Scotland electoral region, following which he was elected as the Scottish Parliament's fifth Presiding Officer.

Election results

2020s

This was the smallest Conservative majority at the 2021 Scottish Parliament election.

2010s

2000s

 
|}

1990s

Notes

References

External links

Constituencies of the Scottish Parliament
Politics of East Renfrewshire
1999 establishments in Scotland
Constituencies established in 1999
Scottish Parliament constituencies and regions 1999–2011
Scottish Parliament constituencies and regions from 2011
Giffnock
Clarkston, East Renfrewshire
Newton Mearns
Eaglesham